Steevi Bacon is a musician from London, UK. He is co-founder member and drummer for the UK based power pop rock band Cats in Space, established May 2015 with guitarist Greg Hart, and their fellow songwriting partner Mick Wilson of British 70s phenomenon 10cc.

He has also recorded at Queen's Mountain recording studios in Montreux, Switzerland completing many unlisted sessions for producer David Richards, and has also played drums on two transatlantic guitar legend Robin Trower albums, Go My Way and Another Day's Blues.

Currently touring with CATS in SPACE, recently completed ten date sellout tour March 2017 with UK rock legends THUNDER with final date at London's Eventim Apollo. The band also guested at Hyde Park BST on 30 June 2017 as opener to headliners Blondie and Phil Collins and many other original 20th century artistes. 12 August 2017 saw the band appear in front of over 20,000 attendance at a sellout Fairport Cropredy Convention 2017.  November 2017 saw Cats in Space invited as support to Deep Purple on their five UK arena dates along with rockers Europe on UK leg of the Long Goodbye Deep Purple world tour. Cats in Space then deviated to join Status Quo as special guests on nine of their Plugged In Live and Rockin' Winter UK Tour dates ending in December, once again with final show at Hammersmith Eventim Apollo.

Discography
CATS in SPACE
Too Many Gods – released on Harmony Factory Records 31 October 2015. Featured lead track 'Mr Heartache' played by Radio 2, Planet Rock and over 250 radio stations worldwide.
Scarecrow - released on Harmony Factory Records on 25 August 2017. (Bacon co-wrote Timebomb)
Cats Alive - Cats in Space (Live at Cardiff MotorPoint Arena) Harmony Factory Records 23 February 2018
Day Trip to Narnia - released on Harmony Factory Records on 1 March 2019 (Bacon co-wrote Chasing Diamonds)
My Kind of Christmas - released on Harmony Factory Records 6 December 2019 - (Bacon co-wrote My Kind of Christmas)
Atlantis - released on Harmony Factory Records 27 November 2020 - (Bacon co-wrote Spaceship Superstar, Sunday Best and Atlantis)
Kickstart The Sun - released on Harmony Factory Records 29 July 2022 - (Bacon co-wrote King Of Stars, Teenage Millionaire*, Hero, and Bootleg Bandoleros) *BBC Radio 2 played Teenage Millionaire on Friday Rock Show

Robin Trower
Go My Way  Aezra Records (75766 70600 20)
Another Day's Blues  V12 Records.

Richard Watts
"RADIATE"

Janey Bombshell
"Rock-A-Roll-Around" (JB001) independent UK release (Bacon co-wrote "Last Night on Earth")

" Dreams" featuring Maria Nayler (v) released on TX Recordings

References

English rock drummers
Musicians from London
Power pop musicians
Cats in Space members